Károly Nemes-Nótás (28 October 1911 – 4 August 1982) was a Hungarian cyclist. He competed in the individual and team road race events at the 1936 Summer Olympics.

References

External links
 

1911 births
1982 deaths
Hungarian male cyclists
Olympic cyclists of Hungary
Cyclists at the 1936 Summer Olympics
Cyclists from Budapest